Nurpur kingdom in the Himalayan foothills of India was founded in 1064 A.D at north-eastern Bari Doab between the Ravi and the Beas rivers at the fusion of Kangra, Duggar, Majha, Dharab and Chamba  areas which ended in 1815. The remainants of Nurpur kingdom exists as ruined forts, restored temples, water bodies and canals in Nurpur tehsil,  Fatehpur tehsil, Pathankot tehsil, Dhar Kalan tehsil, Jawali tehsil, Indora tehsil Bhattiyat tehsil, and Sihunta tehsil.

History
The Nurpur kingdom, originally known as Dhameri (धमेरी/دھمیری/ਧਮੇਰੀ), was founded towards the middle of the 11th century by Tomaras of Delhi. Jhetpal the founder of Nurpur Kingdom in 1064 A.D was the younger brother of Anangpal II of Tomara dynasty from King Arjuna of Mahabharata fame, 2250 years before him. King Vikramaditya who began the Vikrama Samvat era in 57 BCE after defeating the Shakas belonged to the same lineage. The principal era to which the luni-solar system is exclusively adapted is that of Vikramaditya, called Samvat. The prince from whom it was named was of the Tuár dynasty, and is supposed to have reigned at Ujjain (Ujjáyini).

Tomar Raja Mahipal a k.a Kunwar Pāla (1021-1051) of Delhi in 1043 defeated Mahmud of Ghazni's grandson Mawdud of Ghazni and liberated the Nagarkot fort. Mahmud of Ghazni's fifth son Abd al-Rashid (1049-1052) appointed Hastagin Hajib as the governor of Punjab and recaptured liberated Nagarkot fort in 1052 after the death of Raja Mahipal. Late Raja Mahipal's brother Jhetpal Tomar led an expeditionary force to protect Trigarta king Jagdish Chand of Katoch dynasty and successfully recaptured the Kangra fort in 1060 AD. In retaliation, Ibrahim of Ghazna (1059-1099) sent his son, Mahmud, with an army of ghazis consisting of 40,000 cavalry to raid Doab of Punjab region, between 1063 and 1070.  Due to these constant attacks Trigarta Kingdom shifted its capital from Doab Jalandhar to Kangra Fort in 1070 A.D. and to double secure Kangra Fort Jhetpal Tomar over powered the garrison of Ghaznavid Kiladar Kuzbak Khan stationed at Paithan Fort, Pathankot which was the gateway  to Kangra Valley between River Ravi and River Beas  from the plains of Badi doab. Raja Jhetpal,  after the death of Ibrahim of Ghazna in 1099  permanently stationed his garrison at Pathankot and the territorial surname Pathania became surname of clan. 

Nurpur reached its peak between 1580 and 1613 during the reign of Raja Basu Dev who built an impressive fort that can still be seen today but his son Suraj Mal of Nurpur was driven away by Mughals in 1618.

In 1620 the change of name from Dhameri to Nurpur was done by Raja Jagat Singh  to honour Mughal emperor and empress as 'Nur' was a common prefix to their names Nur-ud-din Muhammad Jahangir and Nur Jahan. Nurpur kingdom  paid taxes after it came under Mughals. It rebelled when taxes were raised to 66% and the settlement took place after the War of Taragarh 1640–1642.

Till 1739 kingdom remained a feudatory state of Mughal Empire and became independent during Campaigns of Nader Shah. During Indian campaign of Ahmad Shah Durrani from (1747-1767) Raja Fateh Singh survived the invader but Raja Prithvi Singh (1770-1805) expelled Muslim branch of Pathania (1650-1781) based at Shahpurkandi Fort near Shahpurkandi dam project colony, they migrated to Pakistan in 1947. Also, Prithvi Singh forced his brother Inder Singh (Rey branch) whom he considered as claimant of Nurpur kingdom to take exile in 1779 at Mahal Moriyan Fort Kangra State (presently at Mehal Khas, Bhoranj, Hamirpur), they later migrated to Rey in 1823 after the death of Sansar Chand, Sikh Empire appointed Inder Singh's son Ishri Singh as courtier in the Lahore durbar and awarded Rey jagir. Ishri Singh was also brother-in-law of Dhian Singh, the longest reigning prime minister of Sikh Empire from 1818-1843.

Raja Bhir Singh had to face threats from all sides bordering Sikhs, Gorkhas, Katoch and British. Ultimately after just 10 years of his reign Ranjit Singh the final winner of the contest annexed Nurpur kingdom in 1815. Raja Bhir Singh  retook the Nurpur in 1846 but died fighting at the gates of Nurpur Fort.

His struggle was continued by his son Raja Jaswant Singh Pathania and his uncle's son 'Bansein Wazira' :hi:राम सिंह पठानिया, who resorted to guerilla warfare but was captured by deceit from Lakhanpur, Jammu Fort by Jammu and Kashmir (princely state) which was under British control. The state was annexed by the British East India Company in 1849 and the last ruling monarch of Nurpur, was given Rs 5000/- financially compensated by the British for the loss of his state.

Kings 
The rulers of Nurpur bore the title 'Raja'.

  Raja Jhet Pal
 12th century – 1313  Uncertain number of successors
 1313 – 1353  Jas Pal
 1353 – 1397  Kailas Pal
 1397 – 1438  Nag Pal
 1438 – 1473  Prithi Pal
 1473 – 1513  Bhil Pal
 1513 – 1558  Bakht Mal
 1558 – 1580  Pahari Mal
 1580 – 1613  Basu Dev
 1613 – 1618  Suraj Mal
 1618 – 1646  Raja Jagat Singh
 1646 – 1661  Rajrup Singh
 1661 – 1700  Mandhata Singh
 1700 – 1735  Dayadatha
 1735 – 1770  Fateh Singh
 1770 – 1805  Prithvi Singh
 1805 – 1815  Bhir Singh
 1846 – 1849  Jaswant Singh (state annexed by the British) (d. 1898)

Forts

Nurpur (Dhameri) Fort
Fortified by Raja Vasudev after Pathankot was overtaken by Akbar in the 16th century. It was sacked in 1618 and 1640 by Mughals and remained the main seat of the royal family till 1849.

Taragarh Fort
This fortress was captured by Raja Jagat Singh Pathania from Chamba state and was secretly fortified by him and his sons in preparation for his infamous rebellion against Mughals(1640–42). This fort was never seized or captured. However, Raja Jagat Singh Pathania was persuaded to stop the war against the Mughals. Shahjahan knew that Jagat Singh could not be browbeaten and he could use his help in times of war. Therefore, he sent for a compromise on mutually agreed terms.

The folklore associated with the siege of fort goes that the Mughals forces cordoned the fort for such longtime that they planted mango plants which fruited before the end of siege (this place near taragarh fort today is called Amb ka Bagh literally meaning Mango orchard). Yet this long siege could not break the will of Raja jagat Singh and his men whose ration had diminished. According, to folklore the men of Raja Jagat Singh one day to fool cordoning forces used milk of female dog (who had given litter inside fort but fed in Mughal camp) to prepare a kheer (milk pudding) and threw it out side the fort. When the cordon commander of Mughal forces saw this he died of shock and the news reached the Mughal emperor who was forced to negotiate with Raja Jagat Singh Pathania.

Pathan Fort
The very first fort after which the Pathania became a surname is now in ruins. Today, Fort Road and Gulmohar Resthouse exists on a top of a small hill at that very location.

Temples

Brijraj Mandir Nurpur Fort
It is the biggest shrine representing the Nurpur kingdom. The temple inside the fort called Brij Raj Swami was built in the 16th century and is known to be one of the only places where both the idols of Lord Krishna and Meera Bai are worshiped. Ancient rulers of Nurpur patronised the Pahari painting style which has survived as frescoes in Diwan-i-Aam dates back to 1610 and Raja Mandhata's name is inscribed as restorer on the wall. It also houses statue of Krishan-Mira which is believed to be brought from Fort Chittorgarh when Raja Vasudev laid a siege to capture Rana of Mewar Amar Singh I in 1613. In 1886 ASI discovered the ruins and in 1904 excavated the original temple  where initially statues of Krishan-Mira were installed, built in the style of famous temples of Vrindavan and Mathura as the architecture was not found in Punjab hills.
The shrine was safely buried in the pond in 1618 when the Fort was besieged and there were no chances of survival by Raja Suraj Mal of Nurpur. The shrine came into the dreams of Raja Mandhata (1671-1700) who drained the pond and restored shrine's former glory.

Kali Mata Mandir Nurpur Fort
Patronised by Raja Jagat Singh who practiced his battlefield strategies by playing chauper (chess) with Devi. The temple seems to be rebuilt at the old location.

Raja ka Bagh
On the foots of Fort Mau, established at a 'bauli' (natural spring) to honour a snake born along with Raja Nag Pal in 14th century. Descendants who believe their lineages from Nurpur kingdom offer the first hairs of their newly born sons.

Ratte Ghar Wali Mata
This temple is visible from some majorly parts of Nurpur, because it is located at high location. It is believe that this temple has the divine power, if someone pray for something then their wish is definitely fulfilled. For visiting this temple one should need go from a village named Baduhi, otherwise a backward road from Jassur town also keep you to this temple.

Gallery

See also
Kangra painting

References

History of Himachal Pradesh